Boussoukoula is a department or commune of Noumbiel Province in Burkina Faso.

References 

Departments of Burkina Faso
Noumbiel Province